Calotes htunwini is a species of agamid lizard. It is endemic to Myanmar.

References

Calotes
Reptiles of Myanmar
Reptiles described in 2006
Taxa named by George Robert Zug